Daniel Kaplan may refer to:

 Daniel Kaplan (physicist)
 Daniel Kaplan (footballer)
 Daniel Kablan Duncan, vice-president of the Ivory Coast